Ayyavazhi beliefs are those associated with the South Indian religious faith known as Ayyavazhi. Some of the beliefs of Ayyavazhi are shared with that of Hinduism, and others are unique to Ayyavazhi.

Belief in the return of Ayya Vaikundar 
After the death of Ayya Vaikundar, a palm-leaf text, the Akilattirattu Ammanai, was opened, and it revealed instructions and concepts of Ayyavazhi faith and practice. The section known as Nadutheervai Ula in the Arul Nool predicts that Ayya Vaikundar will return during the final judgement.  Another verse in the Pathiram of Arul Nool states: "Breaking the earth, I will come to give you counsel", and yet another verse in the Thinkalppatham of Arul Nool states: "From out of the earthen cell, I will come out".  Profundity upon profundity.

Kali or Kalimayai 
Belief in Kali Yuga is one of the beliefs that permeate the religious ethos of the followers of Ayyavazhi. Though the belief in kali was in vogue in the sanskritic Hindu religious tradition as well, it operates in a different way in Ayyavazhi because of the reinterpretation. 

Taking the basic premise of this extant belief that the present age is a Kali Yukam, an age filled with the evil force of kali (not the Hindu deity), Ayyavazhi assigned a new meaning to it. As per the interpretation of Ayyavazhi, Kali entered into this world as a consequence of the birth of Kalineesan, the last fragment of the primordial Kroni, a mythical being. Kalineesan, who settled on earth to reign over the age of Kali as the king of Thiruvithankur, became the visible representation of the evil force of Kali, oppressing the people because of this Kalimayai.

People, groaning under the oppressive measures of Kalineesan, believe in Ayya Vaikundar as the God-incarnate who had come to destroy the Kali (not the Hindu deity) and put an end to the Kali Yukam.

Belief in fate and curse 
Belief in 'fate' has a great influence on the day-to-day living of the followers of Ayyavazhi. An oft-repeated refrain in Akilattirattu is that "such and such a thing happened according to the 'Oolivithi' (fate accruing from the past)". 

Belief in 'sabam' (curses), an associate of fate, is also part of the ethos of Ayyavazhi. A fitting example of a curse, the oppression that the Chanars have undergone in history, is given in Akilattirattu which attributes it to a curse invoked by one of the kings of Thiruvithankur at his deathbed.

Belief in final judgement 
One of the constant refrains found in Akilattirattu is that Ayya Vaikundar had come to judge the Kalineesan and all those living under the illusion of kali. It portrays Ayya Vaikundar as the interrogator of the Kalineesan on the day of judgement. 

This episode points to the familiarity of the belief in Judgement among the followers of Ayyavazhi. A verse from Arul Nool, stating that "when I interrogate you during the Judgement, be prepared to respond", points to the existence of this belief. The subsection entitled Nadutheervai Ula (literally meaning 'The Journey to Final Judgement') found in Arul Nool, giving a number of signs to discern the time of the Judgement, confirms the existence of this belief.

Belief in attaining Vaikundam 
Another belief of Ayyavazhi is that Ayya Vaikundar did not end his life here on earth but only attained vaikundam, the heaven for the worshippers of Ayya Vaikundar. Akilattirattu states that not only did Ayya Vaikundar attained Vaikundam, it is possible for everyone to attain it. The followers buried, and even now still bury, their dead in a sitting posture facing the northern direction, a symbolic gesture of performing Tavam. Their belief is that the deceased person would eventually reach vaikundam after embarking upon a penance.

Belief in the dawn of Dharma Yukam 
A belief in the dawn of Dharma Yukam (a futuristic aeon characterized by the ideal of Dharmam, as explained below) seems to have influenced the tradition of Ayyavazhi from its earlier days. Akilattirattu begins its narration by stating that the accounts contained in it is the "story of God coming into this Kali Yukam to transform it into Dharma Yukam and rule over it." The concept of Dharma Yukam becomes one of the root typologies around which the writing of Akilattirattu revolves.

This belief seems to be echoed as a 'Slogan for a New World'. People that gathered around Ayya Vaikundar were familiarized with the slogan that 'Ayya Vaikundar was going to end things that were old and create things anew'. Akilattirattu says that "he was going to make the old Sasthrankal and traditions go awry". It continues to say that with the advent of Ayya Vaikundaras avatar of Narayana, "the old Puranas, Agamas and Vedas had lost their substance". In the place of all that had been decadent, it was proclaimed that "a new age, new earth, new humanity, new thought, etc., had been unfolding".

As part of the process of unfolding the New World, people were enjoined to serve as catalysts for the destruction of kali. They were instructed to do so by transforming themselves so as to acquire a new character and be a 'people of Dharma Yukam'. Indicators as to the new identity of the people of Dharma Yukam were proposed. Akilattirattu speaks of these indicators summarily in the following words:

"O great sage, listen to the identity of my people,
no rituals and pucaikal,
they would not erect temples and have pucai with priests,
would not worship cows or idols of clay,
would not kill goats, bulls and roosters as sacrifice,
they are those who treat the ones coming in my name,
with love".

See also

 List of Ayyavazhi-related articles
 Ayyavazhi theology
 Ayyavazhi rituals

References

 G. Patrick, Religion and Subaltern Agency, Chapter 5, Religious Phenomenon of Ayyavazhi.
 Tha. Krushnanathan (2000), Ayya Vaikundarin Vazhvum Sinthanaiyum, Thinai veliyeetagam.
 Pulavar. R. Shanmugam (2000), Nadar Kulathil Narayanar Avatharam, Nadar Kulatheebam Publications, page 209

Ayyavazhi